The Peckham Truck & Engineering company were suppliers of tram trucks (bogies) and other electrical equipment based in London, UK. They eventually became part of Brush Traction.

References

Defunct manufacturing companies of the United Kingdom